Heinz Arendt (16 May 1917 – 5 January 2006) was a German swimmer who a bronze medal in the 1500 m freestyle the 1938 European Aquatics Championships. He finished seventh in the same event at the 1936 Summer Olympics. 

His sister Gisela Jacob-Arendt and nephew Rainer Jacob were German Olympic swimmers, and Gisela competed along with her brother at the 1936 Games.

References

1917 births
2006 deaths
Swimmers at the 1936 Summer Olympics
Olympic swimmers of Germany
European Aquatics Championships medalists in swimming
German male freestyle swimmers